Eunidia breuningiae is a species of beetle in the family Cerambycidae. It was described by Villiers in 1951. It is known from Egypt, Senegal, Niger, Oman, Yemen, Djibouti, Saudi Arabia, and Chad.

References

Eunidiini
Beetles described in 1951